Brussels-Schuman railway station, officially Brussels-Schuman, is a railway station in the City of Brussels, Belgium, serving the European Quarter. It received its name from the area around the Robert Schuman Roundabout, itself named after Robert Schuman.

Underneath Brussels-Schuman is the rapid transit Schuman station on lines 1 and 5 of the Brussels Metro system, which serves as an important node of the Brussels Intercommunal Transport Company (STIB/MIVB).

History
The original railway line through the station site ran between Brussels-Luxembourg and Brussels-North and was opened on 23 October 1856, though no station was provided. In about 1865, the Grande Compagnie du Luxembourg received subsidies from the state to open stations on the line, by that point surrounded by rapid housing development, and opened a halt called Bruxelles (Rue de la Loi), on a site now occupied by part of the Berlaymont building. The station was closed around 1920.

The site was identified as a future rail and metro connection during the planning and construction of the Berlaymont and Charlemagne buildings, and opened for rail and premetro (underground tram) services on 17 December 1969. The premetro trams were replaced by the new Brussels Metro on 20 September 1976.

From 2008 to 2016, the railway station (and the metro station) underwent major renovation works, increasing the station's capacity by two extra tracks. These connect to a tunnel to the old Schaerbeek-Josaphat station (and marshalling yard) on line 26, in order to offer direct quick connections to Antwerp, Leuven and Brussels Airport. With this third connection, the station has  become one of Brussels' largest. Its new glass roof allows more daylight into the station.

Rail
The rail station (called Bruxelles-Schuman/Brussel-Schuman) is an elevated station, though its north-eastern end is "underground" as it enters a hillside. Its ticket office is located immediately next to the metro station; at one end of the railway station platforms, a stairway leads down to the /, coming out close to Maelbeek/Maalbeek metro station. Trains travelling between Brussels-South railway station and Namur and Luxembourg call at the station. The National Railway Company of Belgium (NMBS/SNCB)'s code for the station is FBSM.

A new tunnel was opened in April 2016 between Brussels-Schuman and Meiser, providing direct connections to Brussels Airport and stations on the Greater Ring of Brussels.

Train services
The station is served by the following service(s):

Intercity services (IC-16) Brussels - Namur - Arlon - Luxembourg
Intercity services (IC-17) Brussels Airport - Brussels-Luxembourg - Namur - Dinant (weekdays)
Intercity services (IC-17) Brussels - Namur - Dinant (weekends)
Intercity services (IC-18) Brussels - Namur - Liege (weekdays)
Intercity services (IC-27) Brussels Airport - Brussels-Luxembourg - Nivelles - Charleroi (weekdays)
Brussels RER services (S4) Aalst - Denderleeuw - Brussels-Luxembourg (- Etterbeek - Merode - Vilvoorde) (weekdays)
Brussels RER services (S5) Mechelen - Brussels-Luxembourg - Etterbeek - Halle - Enghien (- Geraardsbergen) (weekdays)
Brussels RER services (S8) Brussels - Etterbeek - Ottignies - Louvain-la-Neuve
Brussels RER services (S9) Leuven - Brussels-Luxembourg - Etterbeek - Braine-l'Alleud (weekdays, peak hours only)
Brussels RER services (S81) Schaarbeek - Brussels-Luxembourg - Etterbeek - Ottignies (weekdays, peak hours only)

Area
This station is in the centre of Brussels' European Quarter, being adjacent to the Berlaymont building (headquarters of the European Commission), the Justus Lipsius building (used to hold low-level meetings of the Council of the European Union and provide office space to the Council's Secretariat) and numerous other EU offices. It is named after the area around the Robert Schuman Roundabout, which was itself named after Robert Schuman, one of the founding fathers of the European Union, the Council of Europe and NATO. It lies beneath the Rue de la Loi/Wetstraat, a major city thoroughfare, and is close to the Parc du Cinquantenaire/Jubelpark.

See also
 List of railway stations in Belgium
 Rail transport in Belgium
 Transport in Brussels
 History of Brussels

References

Notes

External links

 A peek on the future Schuman Station - December 9, 2007 ifrancis blog
 Brussels explosion: Many dead in attacks on Zaventem airport and Metro

Railway stations in Brussels
European quarter of Brussels
Railway stations opened in 1969
City of Brussels